The East Northamptonshire College or TENC for short is a consortium of secondary schools in East Northamptonshire that offer Post-16 education.

Structure
The Consortium consists of three secondary schools, Rushden Community College based in Rushden, The Ferrers School based in Higham Ferrers and Huxlow Academy based in Irthlingborough. The college provides free transport to the different schools so all students can get to individual lessons.  The College is also in partnership with Prince William School (PWS) based in Oundle

Range of courses
Because there are three different schools, the college can offer a greater range of courses than a normal Sixth Form College. This is seen in the college's rapid growth in recent years. As the College is split between three schools, the government's inspectors - Ofsted - do not inspect the College as a whole but the individual school's sixth forms when secondary education is inspected. This then gives three different reports on how the sixth form is being managed at different schools. The College is officially based at Rushden Community College, where the director and administrative staff are also based.

External links
 Rushden Community College
 Ferrers College
 Huxlow College
 EduBase

Rushden
Sixth form colleges in Northamptonshire
Education in North Northamptonshire